Alabama State University (ASU, Bama State, or Alabama State) is a public historically black university in Montgomery, Alabama. Founded in 1867, ASU is a member-school of the Thurgood Marshall College Fund.

History 

Alabama State University was founded in 1867 as the Lincoln Normal School of Marion in Marion. In December 1873, the State Board accepted the transfer of title to the school after a legislative act was passed authorizing the state to fund a Normal School, and George N. Card was named president. Thus, in 1874, this predecessor of Alabama State University became America's first state-supported educational institution for blacks. This began ASU's history as a "teachers' college."

In 1878, the second president, William Paterson, was appointed. He is honored as a founder of Alabama State University and was the president for 37 of the school's first 48 years. Paterson was instrumental in the move from Marion to Montgomery in 1887.

In 1887, the university opened in its new location in Montgomery, but an Alabama State Supreme Court ruling forced the school to change its name; it was renamed the Normal School for Colored Students. The campus was chosen in 1889 although preparing the buildings at the site took a while longer.

In the decades that followed, Lincoln Normal School became a junior college, and in 1928 became a full four-year institution. In 1929 it became State Teachers College, Alabama State College for Negroes in 1948, and Alabama State College in 1954. In 1969, the State Board of Education, then the governing body of the university, approved a name change; the institution became Alabama State University.

The 1995 Knight vs. Alabama remedial decree transformed ASU into a comprehensive regional institution paving the way for two new undergraduate programs, four new graduate programs, diversity scholarship funding and endowment, funding to build a state-of-the art health sciences facility, and a facility renewal allocation to refurbish three existing buildings.

WVAS-FM was launched on June 15, 1984, beaming 25,000 watts of power from the fifth floor of the Levi Watkins Learning Center for two years before moving to its current location at Thomas Kilby Hall. Today, WVAS has grown to 80,000 watts and has a listenership that spans 18 counties, reaching a total population of more than 651,000. In recent years, the station has also begun streaming its broadcast via the Web, connecting a global audience to the university.

The early 1990s witnessed the beginning of WAPR-FM (Alabama Public Radio), which Alabama State University and Troy University, both of which already held station licenses of their own, cooperated with the University of Alabama in building and operating. WAPR-FM 88.3—Selma's signal reaches the region known colloquially as the Black Belt, about 13 counties in the west central and central parts of Alabama, including the city of Montgomery.

Presidents
Interim presidents excluded

1874–1878: George N. Card
1878–1915: William Burns Paterson
1915–1920: John William Beverly
1920–1925: George Washington Trenholm
1925–1961: Harper Councill Trenholm
1962–1981: Dr. Levi Watkins Sr.
1981–1983: Dr. Robert L. Randolph
1983–1991: Dr. Leon Howard
1991–1994: Dr. Clifford C. Baker
1994–2000: Dr. William Hamilton Harris
2001–2008: Dr. Joe A. Lee
2008–2012: Dr. William Hamilton Harris
2012: Dr. Joseph H. Silver Sr.
2014–2016: Rev. Dr. Gwendolyn E. Boyd
2017–present: Dr. Quinton T. Ross Jr.

Academics
ASU has eight degree-granting colleges, schools, or divisions:

 College of Business Administration
 College of Education
 College of Health Sciences
 College of Liberal Arts & Social Sciences
 College of Science, Mathematics & Technology
 College of Visual & Performing Arts
 Division of Aerospace Studies
 Continuing Education

Alabama State offers 47 degree programs including 31 bachelor's, 11 master's, two Education Specialist and three doctoral programs, Doctorate in Educational Leadership, Policy, and Law, Clinical Doctorate in Physical Therapy, and a Doctorate in Microbiology. In addition, the university offers the W.E.B. DuBois Honors Program for undergraduate students who meet the above average performance criteria.

Due to Alabama State offering only bachelor's degree in Biomedical Engineering and Mechanical Engineering (beginning in 2024), the university established a dual degree engineering partnership with Auburn University and the University of Alabama at Birmingham (UAB) that gives qualified ASU students automatic admissions into Auburn and UAB undergraduate engineering programs.  ASU undergraduate students who successfully complete the program will receive a STEM related bachelor's degree from ASU and an engineering bachelor's degree from Auburn or UAB in approximately five years.

Alabama State is accredited by the Commission on Colleges of the Southern Association of Colleges and Schools, the Association of Collegiate Business Schools and Programs, the National Council for Accreditation of Teacher Education, the National Association of Schools of Music, the National Association of Directors of Teacher Education and Certification, the Accreditation Council for Occupational Therapy, the Commission of Accreditation of Allied Health Education Programs, Commission on Accreditation for Health Informatics and Information Management Education (CAHIIM, the National Association of Schools of Theatre (NAST), and the Council of Social Work Education.

Research centers
Center for Nanobiotechnology Research
Research Infrastructure & Minority Institutions
Center for Leadership & Public Policy
East Asian Institute for Business Research and Culture
Urban Economic Research Development Center
National Center for the Study of Civil Rights and African-American Culture

Campus 

ASU's urban, 172-acre (0.70 km2) campus has Georgian-style red-brick classroom buildings and architecturally contemporary structures. ASU is home to the state-of-the-art 7,400-seat academic and sports facility the ASU Acadome; the Levi Watkins Learning Center, a five-story brick structure with more than 267,000 volumes; the state-of-the-art John L. Buskey Health Sciences Center which is an 80,000 square foot (7,400 m2) facility which houses classrooms, offices, an interdisciplinary clinic, three therapeutic rehabilitation labs, a state-of-the-art Gross Anatomy Lab, Laboratory for the Analysis of Human Motion (LAHM), a Women's Health/Cardiopulmonary lab, and a health sciences computer lab; and WVAS-FM 90.7, the 80,000-watt, university operated public radio station.

Student life
Alabama State University has nearly 6,000 students from more than 40 states and over 20 countries.

More than 70 student organizations are chartered at Alabama State, including ASU Royal Court, nine National Pan-Hellenic Council Greek-letter organizations, a full range of men's and women's intramural and intercollegiate sports, and 17 honors organizations. In addition to social, cultural and religious groups, there are musical opportunities, such as the marching and symphonic bands, the choir, and departmental organizations for most majors. The Hornets also have a Student Government Association, in which every student at the university holds membership.

Athletics

The Alabama State University Department of Athletics currently sponsors men's intercollegiate football, baseball, basketball, golf, tennis, track and cheerleading, along with women's intercollegiate basketball, soccer, softball, bowling, tennis, track, volleyball, golf and cheerleading. Sports teams participate in NCAA Division I (FCS – Football Championship Subdivision for football) in the Southwestern Athletic Conference (SWAC), which it joined in 1982. The university's colors are black and old gold and their nickname is the Hornets.

The Mighty Marching Hornets

Alabama State's marching band is officially known as "The Mighty Marching Hornets". The band has been invited several times to the Honda Battle of the Bands and has been nationally recognized.  
The Mighty Marching Hornets were stars of a documentary series, Bama State Style, which offered a peek into the lives of the students in the band. In 2016, The Mighty Marching Hornets made an appearance in Ang Lee's film Billy Lynn's Long Halftime Walk. In 2017, the band's 2012 halftime performance at the Magic City Classic garnered over three million views on YouTube.  In 2019, the band performed in the Rose Parade in Pasadena, California on New Year's Day. In 2023, Alabama State became the first HBCU to host the annual Honda Battle of the Bands.  The band is traditionally led by four or five drum majors. The band performs at select football games, all SWAC basketball home games, and other special events.

The featured auxiliary is "The Sensational Stingettes", a danceline that debuted in 1977. They were invited to appear in the "Give It 2 U" music video and live performance with artists Robin Thicke, Kendrick Lamar, and 2 Chainz. Also, they were shown in Beyonce's Netflix special "HΘMΣCΘMING: A film by Beyonce".

The most recently added auxiliary is "The Honey-Beez", a danceline composed of only plus-size young women that debuted in 2004. In 2017, they were selected to showcase their talents and compete on America's Got Talent.

The Bama State Collegians
The Bama State Collegians is a big band jazz orchestra sponsored by Alabama State University. In the 1930s, the ensemble was directed by noted jazz trumpeter Erskine Hawkins, an inductee of both the Alabama Jazz Hall of Fame and the Alabama Music Hall of Fame. After moving to New York City, the Collegians, directed by Hawkins, became the Erskine Hawkins Orchestra and produced a string of national hit records, including "Tuxedo Junction", "After Hours", "Tippin' In" and others. The song "Tuxedo Junction", with its recordings by Hawkins and by the Glenn Miller Orchestra, became one of the anthems of World War II. In 2011, Hawkins' story of and his start in the Bama State Collegians was the subject of a Florida State University Film School MFA thesis film, The Collegians, written and directed by Alabama State University alumnus Bryan Lewis.

Student publications
Students are served by two media publications, The Hornet Tribune (student newspaper) and The Hornet (the student yearbook).

See also

WVAS 90.7 FM Radio, Alabama State radio station
Magic City Classic, One of the largest HBCU events and FCS football games in the nation
Turkey Day Classic, One of the oldest HBCU football classics in the nation

Notable alumni

Notable faculty

Further reading

References

External links 

 
 

 
Universities and colleges in Montgomery, Alabama
Educational institutions established in 1867
Universities and colleges accredited by the Southern Association of Colleges and Schools
African-American history in Montgomery, Alabama
1867 establishments in Alabama
Historically black universities and colleges in the United States
Historically segregated African-American schools in Alabama
Public universities and colleges in Alabama